An indirect mayoral election was held at a special sitting of the Cape Town City Council on 6 November 2018 to determine the successor of former mayor Patricia de Lille after she resigned on 31 October. Former mayor and Provincial Minister of Community Safety, Dan Plato, of the Democratic Alliance won the election as the party holds a two-thirds majority in the city council.

Democratic Alliance selection

Nominated
Dan Plato, Provincial Minister of Community Safety; Member of the Western Cape Provincial Parliament; former mayor of Cape Town

Declared
Ian Neilson, Deputy Mayor of Cape Town 
Brett Herron, Mayoral Committee Member for Urban Housing and Transport
 Heinrich Cyril Volmink, Member of the Gauteng Provincial Legislature; former Member of the National Assembly
Grant Twigg, Democratic Alliance Metro Chairperson
 Anda Ntsodo, East Area-based Oversight Member
 Sharna Fernandez, Speaker of the Western Cape Provincial Parliament
 Nomafrench Mbombo, Provincial Minister of Health; Member of the Western Cape Provincial Parliament; former Provincial Minister of Cultural Affairs and Sports

Declined
 Bonginkosi Madikizela, Provincial Minister of Human Settlements; former Provincial Minister of Housing; Member of the Western Cape Provincial Parliament (ran for the party's nomination for premier; lost)
 Helen Zille, Premier of the Western Cape; former Leader of the Democratic Alliance; former mayor of Cape Town

African National Congress selection

Nominated
Xolani Sotashe, Leader of the African National Congress in the Cape Town City Council; Mayoral candidate in 2016; Member of the Cape Town City Council

African Christian Democratic Party selection

Nominated
Grant Haskin, Leader of the African Christian Democratic Caucus; former Deputy Mayor of Cape Town; former Member of the Western Cape Provincial Parliament

Results

References

Cape Town
Elections
Elections in the Western Cape
Cape Town mayoral election
Cape Town mayoral election